Paraphaeosphaeria is a genus of fungi in the Didymosphaeriaceae family. The genus has 23 species found in Europe and North America. Anamorph forms are found in the genus Paraconiothyrium. The genus was circumscribed by O.E. Eriksson in 1967.

Species
Paraphaeosphaeria agavensis
Paraphaeosphaeria amblyspora
Paraphaeosphaeria apicicola
Paraphaeosphaeria barriae
Paraphaeosphaeria capparicola
Paraphaeosphaeria concentrica
Paraphaeosphaeria cylindrospora
Paraphaeosphaeria hongkongensis
Paraphaeosphaeria michotii
Paraphaeosphaeria pilleata
Paraphaeosphaeria recurvifoliae
Paraphaeosphaeria rubrotincta
Paraphaeosphaeria rusci
Paraphaeosphaeria schoenoplecti
Paraphaeosphaeria sporulosa
Paraphaeosphaeria trimerioides
Paraphaeosphaeria vectis
paraphaeosphaeria verruculosa

References

Pleosporales